Meigs Township is one of the fifteen townships of Adams County, Ohio, United States.  The 2010 census found 3,905 people in the township, 2,123 of whom lived in the unincorporated portions of the township.

Geography
Located in the eastern part of the county, it borders the following townships:
Bratton Township - north, west of Franklin Township
Franklin Township - north, east of Bratton Township
Rarden Township, Scioto County - northeast
Brush Creek Township, Scioto County - southeast
Jefferson Township - south, east of Brush Creek Township
Brush Creek Township - south, west of Jefferson Township
Tiffin Township - southwest
Oliver Township - west
Scott Township - northwest

The village of Peebles is located in northern Meigs Township.

History
Meigs Township was organized in 1806. It is named for Return J. Meigs, Jr.

Statewide, the only other Meigs Township is located in Muskingum County.

Government
The township is governed by a three-member board of trustees, who are elected in November of odd-numbered years to a four-year term beginning on the following January 1. 

Two are elected in the year after the presidential election and one is elected in the year before it. There is also an elected township fiscal officer, who serves a four-year term beginning on April 1 of the year after the election, which is held in November of the year before the presidential election. Vacancies in the fiscal officership or on the board of trustees are filled by the remaining trustees.

References

External links
County website

Townships in Adams County, Ohio
1806 establishments in Ohio
Townships in Ohio